Luck of the Draw is the eleventh studio album by Bonnie Raitt, released in 1991.

After being nominated for Grammy awards in four different categories for the album Nick of Time, Raitt went for a creative retreat in Northern California to begin work on Luck of the Draw. "I did it on purpose to see if I could come up with anything," Raitt said in 1991. "In case I won, I wanted to make sure that I had done some writing and didn't feel that Nick of Time was a fluke. I didn't want to win just 'cause I quit drinking and spent twenty years not making any money, you know? There wasn't enough. So I basically forced myself to go to songwriting boot camp. There were three of four days when it didn't happen — but because I didn't have alcohol or unhappiness or anything to get in the way, it started to open up and I started three of the four songs of mine that are on this album. And then it didn't matter if I won or not, because I had proved to myself that it was okay."

The album surpassed Nick of Times commercial success, having sold seven million copies in the United States alone by 2010, and was supported by a 180-date tour from 1991 to 1993.  It replicated much of her U.S. success overseas as well, selling two million in France and Italy .  It remains Raitt's biggest-selling recording to date.

In the liner notes, Raitt dedicated this album to blues guitarist Stevie Ray Vaughan, who died in 1990 and had encouraged her to stop abusing alcohol, writing: "still burning bright".

Track listing

Notes
"Good Man, Good Woman" is a Grammy Award-winning duet with Delbert McClinton and also appears on his album, Never Been Rocked Enough.

Personnel
 Bonnie Raitt – lead vocals, backing vocals (1, 3, 4, 7, 8, 10), acoustic guitar (1, 2, 5, 6, 9, 11), electric guitar (1), slide guitar (1, 2, 4, 10), horn arrangements (4), electric piano (7, 12)
 Scott Thurston – keyboards (1, 11), acoustic guitar (10), electric guitar (10, 11)
 Ivan Neville – Hammond B3 organ (2), keyboards (4)
 Bruce Hornsby – acoustic piano (3), keyboards (3)
 Benmont Tench – Hammond C3 organ (3, 7, 8, 11), acoustic piano (8)
 Ian McLagan – Hammond B3 organ (5)
 Steve Conn – accordion (9)
 Stephen Bruton – acoustic guitar (1), backing vocals (9)
 Randy Jacobs – electric guitar (2)
 Johnny Lee Schell – electric guitar (5)
 John Hiatt – guitar (6), backing vocals (6)
 Mark Goldenberg – acoustic guitar (8, 10)
 Richard Thompson – electric guitar (8, 11), backing vocals (11)
 Billy Vera – electric guitar (9)
 Robben Ford – lead guitar (10)
 James "Hutch" Hutchinson – bass (1-6, 8, 10, 11)
 Don Was – jug bass (9)
 Curt Bisquera – drums (1, 2)
 Ricky Fataar – drums (1, 4, 5, 6, 8, 9, 10)
 Tony Braunagel – drums (3)
 Jeff Porcaro – drums (11)
 Debra Dobkin – percussion (1, 2, 4, 5, 6, 8, 9, 10), backing vocals (10)
 Paulinho da Costa – percussion (3, 7, 11, 12)
 Delbert McClinton – harmonica (2), lead vocals (2)
 Tower of Power Horns – horns (4)
 Stephen "Doc" Kupka – baritone saxophone
 Emilio Castillo – tenor saxophone 
 Steve Grove – tenor saxophone 
 Greg Adams – trumpet, horn arrangements
 Lee Thornburg – trumpet
 Phil Cunningham – penny whistle (7)
 Aaron Shaw – bagpipes (12)
 David Campbell – string arrangements and conductor (12)
 Larry Corbett – cello (12)
 Ernest Ehrhardt – cello (12)
 Dennis Karmazyn – cello (12)
 Carole Castillo – viola (12)
 Rick Gerding – viola (12)
 Pamela Goldsmith – viola (12)
 Novi Novog – viola (12)
 Sweet Pea Atkinson – backing vocals (1, 5, 10)
 Sir Harry Bowens – backing vocals (1, 5, 10)
 David Lasley – backing vocals (1, 3, 7, 8)
 Arnold McCuller – backing vocals (3, 5, 7, 8, 10)
 Kris Kristofferson – backing vocals (5)
 Paul Brady – backing vocals (8, 11)
 Glen Clark – backing vocals (9)
 Daniel Timms – backing vocals (9)

Production 
 Producers – Bonnie Raitt and Don Was
 Engineer and Mixing – Ed Cherney
 Assistant Engineers – Bryant Arnett, Ray Blair, Dan Bosworth and Charlie Paakkari.
 Mastered by Doug Sax at The Mastering Lab (Los Angeles, CA).
 Art Direction – Tommy Steele
 Design – Jeffery Fey
 Photography – Merlyn Rosenberg
 Lettering and Logo – Margo Chase

Charts

Album

Weekly charts

Year-end charts

Decade-end charts

Singles

Certifications

Awards
Grammy Awards

References

Bonnie Raitt albums
1991 albums
Albums produced by Don Was
Capitol Records albums
Grammy Award for Best Solo Rock Vocal Performance
Albums recorded at Capitol Studios